The 2006 J.League Division 1 season was the 14th season since the establishment of the J.League. It began on March 4 and ended on December 2.

General

Promotion/relegation
 At the end of the 2005 season, Kyoto Purple Sanga, Avispa Fukuoka, and Ventforet Kofu were promoted to J1.
 At the end of the 2005 season, Kashiwa Reysol, Tokyo Verdy 1969, and Vissel Kobe were relegated to J2.
 At the end of the 2005 season, Ehime FC was promoted to J2 from JFL

Changes in competition format
 The Division 2 was expanded to 13 clubs.
 In games that require extra time in case of a tie (i.e. two-legged league cup games) away goals rule is adopted.

Changes in clubs
none

Honours

Clubs 

Following eighteen clubs played in J.League Division 1 during 2006 season.  Of these clubs, Kyoto Purple Sanga, Avispa Fukuoka, and Ventforet Kofu are newly promoted clubs.

 Kashima Antlers
 Urawa Red Diamonds
 Omiya Ardija
 JEF United Chiba
 FC Tokyo
 Kawasaki Frontale
 Yokohama F. Marinos
 Ventforet Kofu 
 Albirex Nigata
 Shimizu S-Pulse
 Jublio Iwata
 Nagayo Grampus Eight
 Kyoto Purple Sanga 
 Gamba Osaka
 Cerezo Osaka
 Sanfrecce Hiroshima
 Avispa Fukuoka 
 Oita Trinita

Format 
Eighteen clubs will play in double round-robin (home and away) format, a total of 34 games each. A club receives 3 points for a win, 1 point for a tie, and 0 points for a loss. The clubs are ranked by points, and tie breakers are, in the following order: 
 Goal differential 
 Goals scored 
 Head-to-head results
A draw would be conducted, if necessary.  However, if two clubs are tied at the first place, both clubs will be declared as the champions. The bottom two clubs will be relegated to J2, while the 16th placed club plays a two-legged Promotion/relegation Series.
Changes from previous year
none

Table

Results

Top scorers

Attendance

Awards

Individual

Best Eleven
{| class="wikitable" style="font-size: 95%;"
|-
!Position
!Footballer
!Club
!Nationality
|-
|GK
|Yoshikatsu Kawaguchi (1)
|Júbilo Iwata
|
|-
|DF
|Marcus Tulio Tanaka (3)
|Urawa Red Diamonds
|
|-
|DF
|Satoshi Yamaguchi (1)
|Gamba Osaka
|
|-
|DF
|Akira Kaji (1)
|Gamba Osaka
|
|-
|MF
|Keita Suzuki (1)
|Urawa Red Diamonds
|
|-
|MF
|Yuki Abe (2)
|JEF United Ichihara Chiba
|
|-
|MF
|Kengo Nakamura (1)
|Kawasaki Frontale
|
|-
|MF
|Hiroyuki Taniguchi (1)
|Kawasaki Frontale
|
|-
|MF
|Yasuhito Endō (4)
|Gamba Osaka
|
|-
|FW
|Washington (1)
|Urawa Red Diamonds
|
|-
|FW
|Magno Alves (1)
|Gamba Osaka
|

* The number in brackets denotes the number of times that the footballer has appeared in the Best 11.

References

External links
 J. League Official Stats
 rsssf.com

J1 League seasons
1
Japan
Japan